Soltanabad (also Romanized as Solţānābād) is a village in Jolgeh Rural District Rural District, Shahrabad District, Bardaskan County, Razavi Khorasan Province, Iran. At the 2006 census, its population was 41, in 8 families.

References 

Populated places in Bardaskan County